Major General William Power Burnham (January 10, 1860 − September 27, 1930) was a United States Army officer who is most notable for being the commander of the 82nd Division, now the 82nd Airborne Division, during World War I.

Early life
William Power Burnham was born in Scranton, Pennsylvania, on January 10, 1860. His mother was Olive E. Burnham (1836–1921), and his father, David Roe Burnham (1835–1910), was a career army officer and American Civil War veteran who retired as a major. William P. Burnham attended the Kansas State Agricultural College (now Kansas State University) and then studied at the United States Military Academy (West Point) from 1877 to 1880.

Start of military career
Burnham left West Point before graduating and enlisted in the United States Army's 14th Infantry Regiment.  He attained the rank of sergeant before obtaining a commission as a second lieutenant of infantry in 1883.

Initially assigned to the 6th Infantry Regiment, he served at Fort Douglas and other posts in the western United States until 1889.

In 1889 Burnham attended the School of Application for Infantry and Cavalry  (now the United States Army Command and General Staff College) at Fort Leavenworth. He graduated near the top of his class and was commended for authoring one of three prizewinning class essays, Military Training of the Regular Army.

Burnham later served with the 11th, 6th and 20th Infantry Regiments at posts including: Fort Porter, New York; St. John's Military Academy in Manlius, New York; and Fort Leavenworth. He was promoted to first lieutenant in 1891 and captain in 1898.

Spanish–American War
During the Spanish–American War Burnham was promoted to temporary lieutenant colonel of Volunteers assigned to the 4th Missouri Volunteer Infantry Regiment. He served on the Second Corps staff as Inspector General.

Post-Spanish–American War
During the Philippine–American War Burnham carried out staff assignments in the Philippines and at Fort Sheridan, Illinois. Later assignments included the Presidio, Jefferson Barracks, Fort Shafter, Fort Douglas, and San Juan, Puerto Rico. From February 1913 to August 1914 he was acting commandant of the United States Army Command and General Staff College. In early 1917 he commanded Camp Otis in the Panama Canal Zone.

According to some sources, Burnham can be credited with firing America's first shot in World War I. In March 1915, while he commanded the Puerto Rican Regiment at El Morro, Puerto Rico, the German supply ship Odenwald was docked in San Juan and preparing to put to sea. Burnham warned the German Consul and the ship's captain that he would use force if the captain attempted to leave without proper authority. The captain ignored the warning, and when he headed for the ocean, Burnham ordered the firing of a cannon across the ship's bow, which had the effect of forcing it to return to port.

World War I

In July 1917, three months after the American entry into World War I, Burnham was assigned to command the 56th Regiment at Camp Oglethorpe. In August he was promoted to command of the 164th Infantry Brigade at Camp Gordon as a brigadier general. Beginning in December, Burnham simultaneously commanded the 82nd Division during the period of its initial organization and activation. He is also credited with christening the organization as the "All-American Division," issuing an order saying that the nickname fit because the division of draftees, which included many recent immigrants, was composed of soldiers from all 48 states and so represented the best men from every state in the country.

Burnham commanded the 82nd Division during combat in France, including the St. Mihiel Offensive and the start of the Meuse-Argonne Offensive. He was relieved by General John J. Pershing, Commander-in-Chief of the American Expeditionary Forces (AEF), in early October in order to create an opening for Major General George B. Duncan, the former commander of the 77th Division, whom Pershing wanted to return to divisional command.

After leaving the 82nd Division Burnham was assigned as the U.S. military attaché in Athens, Greece, where he served until July 1919.

Post–World War I
After World War I, Burnham returned to his permanent rank of colonel. He commanded the discharge and replacement depot at Fort McDowell, from 1919 to 1922. In 1922 he was assigned to command the Presidio of San Francisco, where he remained until retiring.

Career as author
During his military service Burnham prepared several articles for professional journals, including: Military Training of the Regular Army (1889); Three Roads to a Commission (1893); Duties of Outposts, Advance and Rear Guards (1893); Regulations of St. John’s Military School (1894); and Historical Sketch, Twentieth United States Infantry (1902).

Retirement, death and burial
Burnham reached the mandatory retirement age of 64 in 1924. In retirement he resided in San Francisco, where he died on September 27, 1930.  He was buried at Arlington National Cemetery, section 3, site 1804.

Awards
His awards included:

United States
The Spanish Campaign, Army of Cuban Occupation, Philippine Campaign, and World War I Victory Medals.

Foreign
His foreign decorations included the British Order of the Bath, the Greek Medal of Military Merit (First Class) and the French Croix de Guerre and Legion of Honor (Officer).

Family
Burnham was the son of Major David R. Burnham, a career Army officer who was a Union Army veteran of the American Civil War.

In 1890 Burnham married Grace Francesca Meacham (1869–1942), the daughter of an Army surgeon. They were the parents of one son and two daughters: Edward Meacham Burnham (1891–1976); Frances Meacham Burnham (1897–1975), the wife of Stephen Horace Curtis a doctor from Troy, New York; and Helen Meacham Burnham (born 1897), the twin sister of Frances and the first wife of Army officer Thomas F. Limbocker, who later lived near Frances Curtis in Albany and Brunswick.

References

External links

1860 births
1930 deaths
United States Army Infantry Branch personnel
People from Scranton, Pennsylvania
People from San Francisco
Honorary Companions of the Order of the Bath
Commandeurs of the Légion d'honneur
Recipients of the Croix de Guerre 1914–1918 (France)
Recipients of the Medal of Military Merit (Greece)
American military personnel of the Spanish–American War
American military personnel of the Philippine–American War
United States Army generals
United States Army generals of World War I
Burials at Arlington National Cemetery
United States Army Command and General Staff College alumni
Kansas State University alumni
United States military attachés
Military personnel from Pennsylvania